Ruan Levine Camara Vitor (born 19 January 1999), formerly known as Ruan Potó, is a Brazilian professional footballer who plays as a winger for Ligue 1 club Ajaccio, on loan from SSA FC.

Club career
A youth product of Vitória for 11 years, Ruan Levine started playing under the nickname "Ruan Potó", named after a Potó - a Brazilian beetle, before switching to play under his real name. He made his senior and professional debut with the club in a 3–1 Campeonato Brasileiro Série B loss to Botafogo-SP on 28 April 2019. On 1 June 2019, he signed a professional contract with Vitória until 2021. He spent the 2020 season on loan with Jacuipense. Returning to Vitória, he had several injuries and setbacks that prevented him from scoring for 2 years. He moved to Jacuipense in June 2021, where he started picking up form again. On 11 September 2022, he moved to newly established club SSA FC And shortly after joined the French Ligue 1 club Ajaccio on loan for the 2022–23 season.

Personal life
Ruan Levin is married and has a daughter born in 2020.

References

External links

1999 births
Living people
Sportspeople from Bahia
Brazilian footballers
Association football wingers
Esporte Clube Vitória players
Esporte Clube Jacuipense players
AC Ajaccio players
Campeonato Brasileiro Série B players
Campeonato Brasileiro Série C players
Campeonato Brasileiro Série D players
Ligue 1 players
Brazilian expatriate footballers
Brazilian expatriates in France
Expatriate footballers in France